Vila Nova de Gaia, or simply Gaia, is a city and a municipality in Porto District in Norte Region, Portugal. It is located south of the city of Porto on the other side of the Douro River.  The city proper had a population of 178,255 in 2001. The municipality has an area of 168.46 km². and a total population of 302,295 inhabitants (2011), making it the most populous municipality in Norte Region. Gaia along with Porto and 12 other municipalities make up the commonly designated Porto Metropolitan Area.

The city contains many cellars (locally known as "caves") where port wine is stored and aged. These cellars have become a major tourist attraction.

History

Vila Nova de Gaia already existed under the Roman Empire as the city of Cale. It developed most likely from a preexistent Celtic Castro, or Neolithic settlement. The origin of the name Cale (or Gale, since in Classical Latin there was not always a clear distinction between the letters "g" and "c") is likely Celtic, from the root "Gall-" with which Celts referred to themselves, similarly to Galicia, Gaul or Galway. The river itself has a Celtic name, Douro (Latinised Durus) after Celtic "dwr", deep water, water or river. In Roman times the bulk of the population probably lived south of the river Douro, and on the north side, there was a smaller settlement around the deep water port which now is the Ribeira neighbourhood of Porto. The name of Porto, in high medieval times Portus Cale, thus stood for the harbour ("portus" in Latin) of the city of Cale. With the important trade of the river Douro, which is easily navigable up to the Régua deep inland, the Porto part of the city came to overgrow Cale, and became the most important part of town, where the Bishopric and the merchants were established.

With the Moorish invasions in the eighth century, the de facto frontier between the Islamic state and the Christian one came to rest for a considerable period of time on the river Douro. With the constant raids and counter-raids, the town of Cale, or Gaia, was deserted and most of its inhabitants took refuge in Porto in the North side of the river. It is in this period, the tenth century, that the late medieval Lenda de Gaia (Legend of Gaia) is set.

After the conquest and pacification of the southern side of the Douro river after 1035, with the exodus or expulsion of the Muslim populations, leaving behind semi-abandoned fertile lands, colonists from the north settled in exchange for better feudal contracts with the newly appointed lords. These migrants refounded the old city of Cale or Gaia under the name of Vila Nova de Gaia (new town of Gaia) around the old castle and ruins of "old Gaia".

The name of the double city of Porto and Gaia was frequently referred to in contemporary documents as "villa de Portucale", and the county of the Kingdom of León which was centered on it was named Condado Portucalense. This county was eventually expanded and after gaining its independence, became the Kingdom of Portugal.

Parishes

Administratively, the municipality is divided into 15 civil parishes (freguesias):

The parish Santa Marinha e São Pedro da Afurada contains the city centre of Vila Nova de Gaia.

Coat of arms and flag
The coat of arms consists of a grey crest with two golden-yellow bunches of grapes on the bottom with a black castle over the water, and with a person blowing the horn. The grapes intend to represent the city's connection with the wine industry, mainly Port wine, whose cellars are in the lower part of the city.

The flag features the coat of arms on a field of eight wedges (gyronny) of alternating dark yellow and black, beginning with the north-northeast octant.

Leisure

Beaches 
Vila Nova de Gaia is the Portuguese municipality with the highest number of Blue Flag beaches in 2009 and in 2010: 17 beaches along 17 km of seaside. Some popular beaches are: Miramar, Granja, Aguda, Valadares, Francelos, Madalena and Canidelo. Praia da Granja is a FEE Blue Flag beach in the parish of São Félix da Marinha. This area was a farm in the 18th century belong to the Grijó Monastery and used as a rest place of monks and priests.

Parks and gardens 
 Gaia Biological Park is the largest park in the city, with an area of 35 hectares. The Park established in 1983 as an environmental education center, features a 3 km walkway along with hundreds of species of animals and plants.
 Opened in August 2005, the Lavandeira Park is a place for leisure activities with a lake, pedestrian walks, picnic areas and theme gardens. It has an area of 11 hectares located in Oliveira do Douro.
 Jardim do Morro ("Garden of the Hill") is a garden located in the parish of Santa Marinha, near the Sera do Pilar Monastery. It was established in 1927. There is a lake, a number of plant species including Tilias.
 The Littoral Station of Aguda is a show aquarium opened in 1999 on the beach of Aguda in Arcozelo. The building designed by the architect João Paulo Peixoto includes 3 main sections: Fisheries Museum displaying fishery equipment; Aquarius demonstrating local aquatic fauna and flora, and the Department of Environmental Education and Scientific Research on marine ecology, fishery and aquaculture.
 Local Nature Reserve of the Douro Estuary is a small nature reserve established in 2007 with the aim of the protection of birds and landscape. There can be seen cormorants, herons, white egrets, tortoises, sea turtles, plovers, red knots, various species of seagulls, kingfishers among many other birds throughout a year. São Paio Bay is a popular spot for bird watchers.

There are also Dunes Park, Botanical Park of Castelo, Camelias Garden, Streams of Gaia, Maria Pia Bridge Park in Vila Nova de Gaia.

Tourism 

The city attracts a great number of tourists for its different points of interest and the wine cellars are considered to be a must-see in any trip to area of Porto.

Museums 

House-Museum Teixeira Lopes| Diogo de Macedo Gallery is a cultural center consisting of the house of the sculptor António Teixeira Lopes and recently built Diogo de Macedo Galleries located in Vila Nova de Gaia. The building of the museum was constructed in 1895 by António Teixeira Lopes and his brother José Teixeira Lopes as a residence and an atelier. The Master donated this property to the municipality of Vila Nova de Gaia, and it was opened to the public as a house-museum in 1933. Diogo de Macedo Gallery was established in 1975 in a building annexed to Teixeira Lopes' atelier. The Art Galleries in the House-museum demonstrates works of Portuguese painters and sculptors, as well as pieces of pottery factories of Gaia, while Diogo de Macedo Galleries display the sculptural works of Diogo de Macedo and his art collection consisting of decorative art examples from 16th-20th centuries.

Solar dos Condes de Resende is a former manorial property which is now the headquarter of the Municipal House of Culture located in the village of Negrelos. Its construction dates back to the Medieval Ages. In the 16th century, the property belonged to Tomé da Costa, a nobleman from Vila Nova de Gaia who served for the Kingdom during the period of the Philippine dynasty. The building was also known as Quinta da Costa. The building has a semi-public chapel dedicated to São Tomé, a Baroque garden with camellias and a large tank of stonework that receives water from the source of São Mamede in Serra de Canelas. There is also a statue dedicated to the writer Eça de Queiroz who fell in love with the daughter of the owner (4th Count of Resende) and married her (Emília de Castro Pamplona). After the City Council of Gaia purchased the property in 1984, it has been operating as Municipal House of Culture. There is a Documentation Center for History, Archaeology, Art and Anthropology, as well as a museum site with Azuaga Marciano Collection.

Gallery

Sister City

Vila Nova de Gaia is twinned with:

 Concord, Massachusetts, United States of America

 Dunavarsány, Hungary

Notable people 

 Maria Isabel Wittenhall van Zeller (1749–1819) a pioneer in the use of vaccination against smallpox.
 António Soares dos Reis (1847-1889) a Portuguese sculptor.
 António Teixeira Lopes (1866–1942) a Portuguese sculptor.
 Daniel Pina Cabral (1924–2008) an Anglican bishop, Bishop of Lebombo, Mozambique, 1968 to 1976
 António Pires Veloso (1926–2014) an Army General, overseas Governor & political candidate
 António Reis (1927–1991) a film director, screenwriter and producer, poet, sculptor and ethnographer.
 Maria Alberta Menéres (1930–2019) a Portuguese author, children's writer, journalist and poet.
 Bruce Duncan Guimaraens (1935–2002) a Portuguese-British port wine maker.
 António Pinho Vargas (born 1951) a jazz and contemporary music composer and pianist 
 Paulo Rangel (born 1968) a Portuguese jurist, politician and MEP since 2009.
 Dalila Carmo (born 1974) a Portuguese actress.
 Sónia Rocha (born ca.1975) a cell biologist and academic at University of Liverpool

Sport 
 João Pinto (born 1961) a retired footballer with 408 club caps and 70 for Portugal.
 José Tavares (born 1966) a retired footballer with 294 club caps and 8 for Portugal.
 Vítor Baía (born 1969) a retired football goalkeeper with 447 club caps and 80 for Portugal.
 Basílio Almeida (born 1971) a footballer with 499 club caps
 António Folha (born 1971) a footballer with 337 club caps and 26 for Portugal & current manager.
 Rui Jorge (born 1973) a retired footballer with 324 club caps and 45 for Portugal.
 Fernando Jorge Tavares de Oliveira (born 1975), known as Bock, a retired footballer with 635 club caps
 Artur Soares Dias (born 1979) a football referee with FIFA & UEFA since 2010.
 Ricardo Costa (born 1981) a footballer with 458 club caps and 22 for Portugal.
 Lenine Cunha (born 1982) a Paralympic athlete, competed in the 2000 Summer Paralympics
 Luís Monteiro (born 1983) a former free-style swimmer, competed at the 2004 Summer Olympics 
 Bruno Vale (born 1983) a retired football goalkeeper with 476 club caps and one for Portugal.
 Vanessa Fernandes (born 1985) a triathlete and silver medallist at the 2008 Summer Olympics
 André Gomes (born 1993) with over 200 club caps and 29 for Portugal.
 Ivo Oliveira & Rui Oliveira (twins, born 1996) Portuguese racing cyclists

References

External links

 Photos from Vila Nova de Gaia
 Gaia Extra - Local news site about Vila Nova de Gaia
 Gaia The Magic City - Local Social Network
 

 
Municipalities of Porto District
Cities in Portugal